The 2021 Atlantic 10 Conference softball tournament was held at the SJU Softball Field on the campus of Saint Joseph's University in Merion Station, Pennsylvania from May 13 through May 15, 2021. The tournament winners, George Washington, earned the Atlantic 10 Conference's automatic bid to the 2021 NCAA Division I softball tournament

Tournament

Bracket

References

Tournament
Atlantic 10 Conference softball tournament
2021 in sports in Pennsylvania
Softball in Pennsylvania